Natalia Ryzhevich (born 4 March 1977) is a Belarusian former footballer.

She played as a midfielder for FC Babruyshanka, Universitet Vitebsk and FC Minsk in Belarus, and Lada Togliatti in Russia. She also played the UEFA Champions League with all but Minsk.

Ryzhevich was a founding member of the Belarusian national team, taking part in November 1995 in its first game ever, in the Euro 1997 qualifiers. She played in the national team for 13 years, until 2008.

References

1977 births
Belarusian women's footballers
Living people
Expatriate women's footballers in Russia
Women's association football midfielders
Belarus women's international footballers
FC Minsk (women) players
FC Lada Togliatti (women) players
Bobruichanka Bobruisk players
Universitet Vitebsk players